Shafiabad may refer to:
Shafiabad, Gilan
Shafiabad, Golestan
Shafiabad, Kerman
Shafiabad, Abyek, Qazvin Province
Shafiabad, Qazvin
Shafiabad (36°20′ N 50°05′ E), Qazvin
Shafiabad, Bardaskan, Razavi Khorasan Province
Shafiabad, Joghatai, Razavi Khorasan Province
Shafiabad, Nishapur, Razavi Khorasan Province

See also
Safiabad (disambiguation)